Macasinia mirabilana is a species of moth of the family Tortricidae. It is found in Minas Gerais, Brazil.

The wingspan is 16–17 mm. The ground colour of the forewings is whitish brown in the form of spots suffused with brown-grey medially, mixed brown grey up to the middle and white postmedially. The hindwings are brown, but paler basally.

References

Moths described in 2002
Cochylini